Kumbadjena is a genus of velvet worms in the family Peripatopsidae. All species in this genus are ovoviviparous, all have 15 pairs of oncopods (legs), and all are found in the southwest of Western Australia.

Species 
The genus contains the following species:

 Kumbadjena extrema Sato, Buckman-Young, Harvey & Giribet, 2018
 Kumbadjena kaata Reid, 2002
 Kumbadjena karricola Sato, Buckman-Young, Harvey & Giribet, 2018
 Kumbadjena occidentalis (Fletcher, 1895)
 Kumbadjena shannonensis Reid, 2002
 Kumbadjena toolbrunupensis Sato, Buckman-Young, Harvey & Giribet, 2018

References 

Onychophorans of Australasia
Onychophoran genera
Taxa named by Amanda Reid (malacologist)